The 2019–20 1. FC Köln season was the 72nd season in the football club's history and first consecutive and 48th overall season in the top flight of German football, the Bundesliga, having been promoted from the 2. Bundesliga in 2019. 1. FC Köln participated in this season's edition of the domestic cup, the DFB-Pokal. Köln were the reigning 2. Bundesliga champions. This was the 72nd season for Köln in the Müngersdorfer Stadion, located in Cologne, North Rhine-Westphalia, Germany. The season covered a period from 1 July 2019 to 30 June 2020.

Achim Beierlorzer was sacked on 9 November 2019 after posting a 2–1–8 record in the first eleven matches of the season, sitting in 17th place in the Bundesliga. He was replaced by former Hamburger SV manager Markus Gisdol on 18 November 2019. On 1 May 2020, three players from the team tested positive for COVID-19, and said that they will not confirm the three players.

Players

Squad information

Kits
 Shirt sponsor: Rewe
 Shirt manufacturer: Uhlsport

Transfers

Transfers in

Transfers out

Friendly matches

Competitions

Overview

Bundesliga

League table

Results summary

Results by round

Matches
The Bundesliga schedule was announced on 28 June 2019.

DFB-Pokal

Statistics

Appearances and goals

|-
! colspan=14 style=background:#dcdcdc; text-align:center| Goalkeepers

|-
! colspan=14 style=background:#dcdcdc; text-align:center| Defenders

|-
! colspan=14 style=background:#dcdcdc; text-align:center| Midfielders

|-
! colspan=14 style=background:#dcdcdc; text-align:center| Forwards

|-
! colspan=14 style=background:#dcdcdc; text-align:center| Players transferred out during the season

|-

References

1. FC Köln seasons
Cologne, North Rhine-Westphalia